Anthony George Reginald Strahan  (born 1 January 1946) is a retired Australian freestyle swimmer. At the 1962 British Empire and Commonwealth Games in Perth, Western Australia, Strahan won a gold medal in the 4 × 220 yards freestyle relay, along with Murray Rose, Bob Windle and Allan Wood.

Strahan was born in Geelong, Victoria, the son of Henry and Diana Strahan. He attended Newton State School, before completing secondary education at the Geelong College, also in Newtown.

Strahan is a decorated surf lifesaver. In June 2019, he was awarded with an Order of Australia Medal (OAM) for service to surf lifesaving.

References

1946 births
Living people
Australian surf lifesavers
Australian male freestyle swimmers
Sportspeople from Geelong
Commonwealth Games medallists in swimming
Commonwealth Games gold medallists for Australia
Swimmers at the 1962 British Empire and Commonwealth Games
Members of the Order of Australia
Medallists at the 1962 British Empire and Commonwealth Games